Parappillil Ramakrishnan Nair Ramachandra Menon is the former Chief justice of Chhattisgarh High Court and was judge of the Kerala High Court.

Early life and education
Ramachandra Menon  was born on 1 June 1959. He obtained a law degree from Government Law College, Ernakulam.

Career
PRR Menon was enrolled as Advocate on 8 January 1983 and started practice at Ernakulam. He was elevated as Additional Judge of High Court of Kerala on 5 January 2009 and became permanent from 15 December 2010. 

He was given charge as Chief justice of Chhattisgarh High Court on 30 April 2019 by President of India. He took oath on 6 May 2019 by Governor Anandiben Patel as Chief Justice of Chhattisgarh High Court.

References

Living people
Judges of the Kerala High Court
1959 births

Indian judges
Chief Justices of Chhattisgarh High Court